The Islamic Azad University, South Tehran Branch is a branch of the Islamic Azad University which was established in Tehran, Iran. It started its activities with 700 students who mostly studied in the fields of engineering.  This university is considered one of the best branches of the Islamic Azad University.

Colleges and Faculties
College of Engineering and Sciences
College of Humanities and Social Sciences
Faculty of Industrial Engineering
Faculty of Physical Education and Sport Sciences
Faculty of Arts and Architecture

Faculty of Engineering

Department of Civil Engineering
 include: Water and Hydraulic Structures (Ph.D. and Masters)
          Structures (Ph.D. and Masters)
          Earth Quake  (Ph.D.)
          Transportation (Ph.D. and Masters)
          Civil (BS)
          Survey (BS)
          Remote Sensing (Masters)
          GIS (Masters)
Department of Electrical Engineering
 include: Electrical(Ph.D. and Masters)
          Power (Masters)
          Telecommunication (Masters)
          Mechatronics (Masters)
Department of Computer and IT Engineering
 include: Software(Masters)
          Hardware (Masters)
          IT (Masters)
Department of Mechanical Engineering
 include: Mechanical Engineering (Undergraduate)
          Energy Conversion (Ph.D. & Masters)
          Applied Design (Ph.D. & Masters)
          Energy Systems (Ph.D. & Master)
          Automotive Engineering (Ph.D. & Master)
Department of Industrial Engineering
 include: Operations Research and Systems (Ph.D.)
          Planning and Management (Ph.D.)
          Automation (Ph.D.)
          Systems Management and Productivity(BS and Masters)
Department of Chemical Engineering
 include: Thermodynamics and Kinetics (Masters)
          Environmental Engineering (Masters)
          Process Engineering (Masters)
Department of Mine Engineering
 include: Extraction (Masters)
          Exploration (Masters)
Department of Materials Engineering
 include: Identification and selection of engineering materials (Masters)
Department of Textile Engineering
 include: Textile Chemistry and Fiber Science (Masters)
          Textile Technology (Masters)
Department of Petroleum Engineering
 include: Oil drilling and mining engineering (BS)

Scientific Journals 
This university unit currently has 16 scientific journals, 7 of which are in English and the rest in Persian.

Three  journals of this university unit are published by the Springer Science+Business Media publications in Germany.

See also

 Higher education in Iran
 List of universities in Iran
 Islamic Azad University
 Islamic Azad University Central Tehran Branch
 Islamic Azad University, Science and Research Branch, Tehran
 Islamic Azad University West Tehran Branch
 Islamic Azad University of Tehran-North

References

External links
Islamic Student Association

Universities in Tehran
South Tehran